Three ships of the Royal Navy have borne the name HMS Acute:

 was a 12-gun gunboat launched in 1797 and sold in 1802.
 was a 12-gun gun-brig launched in 1804. She was reduced to harbour service in 1813 and was transferred to the Coastguard in 1831.
 was an  ordered as HMS Alert but renamed in 1941 and launched in 1942. She was expended as a target in 1964.

See also

References

Royal Navy ship names